Saousoalii Poe Siavii, Jr. (November 14, 1978 – January 13, 2022) was an American football defensive tackle in the National Football League for the Kansas City Chiefs, Dallas Cowboys, and Seattle Seahawks. He played college football at the University of Oregon.

Early years
Siavii attended Tafuna High School. He played for one year at Dixie State Junior College, before leaving for Butte Community College. He played 2 seasons, receiving All-NorCal Conference honors in 2000. In 2001, he was declared ineligible and was forced to spend the year earning his degree, before transferring to the University of Oregon.

As a junior, he was mainly a reserve defensive tackle with only 2 starts, posting 15 tackles (2.5 for loss) and a half sack. As a senior, he was named a starter in a defensive line that included Igor Olshansky, registering 43 tackles and 2 sacks.

He finished his 2-year career with 58 tackles (8.5 for loss), 2.5 sacks, 3 pass deflections, and one fumble recovery.

Professional career

Kansas City Chiefs
Siavii was selected by the Kansas City Chiefs in the second round (36th overall) of the 2004 NFL Draft. He was expected to be a run stopper on the defensive line but struggled as a rookie. He collected 12 tackles (4 for loss), one sack and 3 quarterback pressures.

In 2005, his playing time was limited by a knee injury he suffered in training camp. He played in 14 games, recording 15 tackles and 3 quarterback pressures.

In 2006, repeated knee injuries kept Siavii on the physically unable to perform list before he was waived on September 2, 2006. He eventually needed microfracture surgery on his right knee.

Dallas Cowboys
After being out of football for 2 years, he was signed as a free agent by the Dallas Cowboys on January 23, 2008. He was released on August 31.

On January 12, 2009, he was re-signed. He played in 16 games registering 11 tackles.

On April 8, 2010, he was re-signed by the team. He was cut on September 4, 2010.

Seattle Seahawks
On September 5, 2010, he was claimed off waivers by the Seattle Seahawks. He played in 14 games (6 starts), while setting a career-high in tackles (30), before being placed on the injured reserve list with a bruised spinal cord injury on December 23. He was released on September 4, 2011.

Legal trouble and death

On August 19, 2005, he was arrested for misdemeanor assault for his role in a bar fight in Minnesota. 

On August 26, 2019, he was arrested for charges related to illegal firearms in Kansas City, Missouri. On November 15, 2019, he was indicted by the United States Attorney for the Western District of Missouri on additional conspiracy and drug-trafficking charges; this supersedes his original indictment. On July 31, 2020, he was arrested on charges of 2nd degree burglary and a misdemeanor stealing charge. 

While awaiting trial at United States Penitentiary, Leavenworth, on January 13, 2022, Siavii was found unresponsive in his cell. He was taken to the hospital where he was pronounced dead at the age of 43.

References

1978 births
2022 deaths
People from Pago Pago
Players of American football from American Samoa
American football defensive tackles
Utah Tech Trailblazers football players
Butte Roadrunners football players
Oregon Ducks football players
Kansas City Chiefs players
Dallas Cowboys players
Seattle Seahawks players
American sportspeople of Samoan descent
People charged with crimes
American people who died in prison custody
Prisoners who died in United States federal government detention